Bejai is one of the major localities in Mangalore city, Karnataka, India. The series of Bharath malls, Bharath mall & Bharath mall 2 (under construction), are located here. It is one of the upscale & the busiest residential cum commercial localities of Mangalore. Bejai - Kadri belt is also regarded as the Manhattan of Mangalore with many high-rise buildings.

Gallery

Notable centres
 KSRTC Main Bus Station, Mangalore
 Mangalore Electricity Supply Company Limited Corporate Office
 Bejai Museum
 Bejai Market Complex

Malls
 Bharath Mall
 Bharath Mall 2
 Pio Mall
 Kingdom Mall - Pais Garden
 Swami Vivekanand Park.

Major Restaurants
 Pizza Hut
 Cafe Coffee Day
 Gajalee Sea Food
 Spindrift
 Basil Cafe
 Surabhi Restaurant
 Jordania Restaurant
 Chicken Lagoon
 Danish
 Kudla Kitchen Sea Food
 Belly G Resto Cafe
 Al Baig

See also 
 Kadri
 Kankanadi
 Balmatta
 Attavar
 Falnir
 Sasihithlu Beach
 NITK Beach
 Panambur Beach
 Tannirbhavi Beach
 Ullal beach
 Someshwar Beach
 Pilikula Nisargadhama
 Kadri Park
 Tagore Park
 St. Aloysius Chapel
 Bejai Museum
 Aloyseum
 Kudla Kudru

References

Localities in Mangalore